Chlamydia abortus is a species in Chlamydiota that causes abortion and fetal death in mammals, including humans. Chlamydia abortus was renamed in 1999 as Chlamydophila psittaci along with all Chlamydiota except Chlamydia trachomatis.  This was based on a lack of evident glycogen production and on resistance to the antibiotic sulfadiazine.  In 1999 C. psittaci and C. abortus were recognized as distinct species based on differences of pathogenicity and DNA–DNA hybridization. In 2015, this new name was reverted to Chlamydia.

In humans
There are approximately one or two cases of chlamydiosis diagnosis in pregnant women in the United Kingdom per year. Typically transmission occurs from contact with livestock who have recently given birth. The true prevalence in humans is unknown because serological antibody tests are unable to distinguish between C. abortus and other more common species such as Chlamydia trachomatis.

In other animals
Chlamydia abortus is endemic among ruminants such as cows and sheep and has been associated with abortion in a horse, a rabbit, guinea pigs, mice, pigs and humans.  Infected females shed bacteria near the time of ovulation, so C. abortus is transmitted orally and sexually among mammals.  All C. abortus strains were isolated or PCR-amplified from the placenta or fetal organs after spontaneous abortion.  C. abortus infection generally remains unapparent until an animal aborts late in gestation or gives birth to a weak or dead fetus.

Chlamydia abortus has been isolated from birds.

Genome structure
Chlamydia abortus has a relatively small genome that contains 1.14 Mbp with 961 protein coding genes.

References

Further reading
 
 

Animal bacterial diseases
Chlamydiota
Ruminant diseases
Zoonoses
Zoonotic bacterial diseases
Chlamydia infections